Nominal techniques in computer science are a range of techniques, based on nominal sets, for handling names and binding, e.g. in abstract syntax.  Research into nominal sets gave rise to nominal terms, a metalanguage for embedding object languages with name binding constructs.

See also
 De Bruijn index
 Higher order abstract syntax

References

 
 

Theoretical computer science